Alioune Camara (born 16 December 1943) is a former Senegalese wrestler who competed in the 1972 Summer Olympics.

References

External links
 

1943 births
Living people
Olympic wrestlers of Senegal
Wrestlers at the 1972 Summer Olympics
Senegalese male sport wrestlers